Harobelavadi is a village in Dharwad district of Karnataka, India.

Demographics 
As of the 2011 Census of India there were 610 households in Harobelavadi and a total population of 2,957 consisting of 1,512 males and 1,445 females. There were 322 children ages 0-6.

References

Villages in Dharwad district